Sarah Henrietta Purser RHA (22 March 1848 – 7 August 1943) was an Irish artist mainly noted for her work with stained glass.

Biography 

Purser was born in Kingstown (now Dún Laoghaire) in County Dublin, and raised in Dungarvan, County Waterford. She was one of the numerous children of Benjamin Purser, a prosperous flour miller and brewer, and his wife Anne Mallet. She was related to Sir Frederic W. Burton, RHA (1816-1900), who was a son of Hannah Mallet. The Purser family had come to Ireland from Gloucestershire in the eighteenth century. Two of her brothers, John and Louis, became professors at Trinity College Dublin. Her niece, Olive Purser, daughter of her brother Alfred,  was the first woman scholar in TCD. 

Until her death, Purser lived for many years in Mespil House, a Georgian mansion with beautiful plaster ceilings on Mespil Road, on the banks of the Grand Canal. Here she was "at home" every Tuesday afternoon to Dublin's writers and artists; her afternoon parties were a fixture of Dublin literary life. Mespil House was demolished after she died and its footprint developed into apartments. She was buried in Mount Jerome Cemetery beside her brothers John and Louis.

Education 
At thirteen, she attended the Moravian school, Institution Evangélique de Montmirail, Switzerland, where she learnt to speak fluent French and began painting. In 1873, her father's business failed and she decided to become a full-time painter. She attended classes at the Dublin Metropolitan School of Art. She joined the Dublin Sketching Club, where she was later appointed an honorary member. In 1874, she distinguished herself in the National Competition. In 1878, she again contributed to the RHA, and for the next fifty years became a regular exhibitor, mainly portraits, and showed an average of three works per show.

In 1878–79, she studied at the Académie Julian in Paris where she met the German painter Louise Catherine Breslau, with whom she became a lifelong friend.

Career 

Sarah Purser became wealthy through astute investments, particularly in Guinness, for which several of her male relatives had worked over the years.  She was very active in the art world in Dublin and was involved in the setting up of the Hugh Lane Municipal Gallery, persuading the Irish government to provide Charlemont House in Parnell Square to house the gallery.

She had a studio at 11 Harcourt Terrace where she lived from 1887-1909.

She was the second woman to sit on the Board of Governors and Guardians, National Gallery of Ireland, 1914–1943.

She was made an Honorary Member of the Royal Hibernian Academy in 1890; the first female Associate Member in 1923 and the first female Member in 1924.
 
In 1924, she initiated the movement for the launching of the Friends of the National Collection of Ireland.

Portraiture
She worked mostly as a portraitist. Through her talent and energy, and owing to her friendship with the Gore-Booths, she was very successful in obtaining commissions, famously commenting
"I went through the British aristocracy like the measles."
When the Viceroy of Ireland commissioned her to portray his children in 1888 his choice reflected her position as the country's foremost portraitist.

In 1977,  Bruce Arnold noted
"some of her finest and most sensitive work was not strictly portraiture, for example, An Irish Idyll in the Ulster Museum, and Le Petit Déjeuner (in the National Gallery of Ireland)."

Glass (An Túr Gloine) 

Sarah Purser financed An Túr Gloine (The Tower of Glass), a stained glass cooperative, at 24 Upper Pembroke and ran it from its inauguration in 1903 until her retirement in 1940. Michael Healy (1873-1941) was the first of a number of distinguished recruits, such as Catherine O'Brien (1882-1963), Evie Hone (1894-1955), Wilhelmina Geddes (1887-1955), Beatrice Elvery (1881-1970) and Ethel Rhind (c.1879 -1952). Purser was determined the stained glass workshop should adhere to true Arts and Crafts philosophy: 'Each window is the work of one artist who makes the sketch and cartoon and selects and paints every morsel of glass him or herself'.

Purser did not produce many items of stained glass herself. Most of the stained glass works were painted by other members of the cooperative, presumably under her direction. Two early works, 1904, were St. Ita for St. Brendan's Cathedral, Loughrea and The Good Shepard for St. Columba's College, Dublin. Her last stained glass work is thought to be The Good Shepard and the Good Samaritan, 1926, for the Church of Ireland at Killucan, Co. Westmeath.

Legacy

Purser is commemorated by a plaque on Harcourt Terrace. The Post issued a commemorative stamp for her as part of a series on "Pioneering Women" in 2020.  

Various portraits painted by Purser are held in the National Gallery of Ireland.

Archives relating to Sarah Purser are housed in the Centre for the Study of Irish Art, National Gallery of Ireland.  An Túr Gloine archive is held in the Centre for the Study of Irish Art, National Gallery of Ireland.

See also

 List of Irish artists

References

Notes
Sarah Purser at the Princess Grace Irish Library
 Bruce Arnold (1977). Irish art: a concise history (2 ed.) London: Thames and Hudson. .
John O'Grady (1996). The Life and Work of Sarah Purser Four Courts Press. .

External links

1848 births
1943 deaths
19th-century Irish painters
20th-century Irish painters
20th-century Irish women artists
19th-century Irish women artists
Alumni of the National College of Art and Design
Académie Julian alumni
Burials at Mount Jerome Cemetery and Crematorium
Irish women painters
Irish stained glass artists and manufacturers
Irish LGBT artists
People from Dungarvan
People from Dún Laoghaire